Sang Sarag (also known as Sang Sarak and Sang S‘erek) is a village in Rastupey Rural District, in the Central District of Savadkuh County, Mazandaran Province, Iran. At the 2006 census, its population was 79, in 22 families.

References 

Populated places in Savadkuh County